Grieder is a surname. Notable people with the surname include:

 Alfons Grieder (1939–2003), Swiss rudimental drummer
 Franziska Grieder, Swiss-American veterinary scientist
 Hans Grieder (1901–1972), Swiss gymnast